Mittelhäusern railway station is a railway station in the municipality of Köniz, in the Swiss canton of Bern. It is an intermediate stop on the standard gauge Bern–Schwarzenburg line of BLS AG.

Services 
The following services stop at Mittelhäusern:

References

External links 
 
 

Railway stations in the canton of Bern
BLS railway stations